Kaptipada is a community development block that forms an administrative division in Kaptipada subdivision of Mayurbhanj district in the Indian state of Odisha. Kaptipada was a Kaptipada estate, which was merged with Mayurbhanj State in 1890.

Demographics 

Kaptipada block located in the south-eastern part of Mayurbhanj. It is surrounded by Udala C.D. Block from north-west, north, and north-east, Balasore District from east and south, Keonjhar District from south-west, Thakurmunda C.D. Block from west. It is located in the north-central plateau of Odisha. The block has 26 Gram Panchayat i.e., Kolialam, J.P.S. Jamdiha, Nuddiha, Pedagodi, Badbisole, Debala, Pingu, Badgudgudia, Chakradharpur, Kaptipada, Jhinkpada, Badkhaladi, Salchua, Jadida, Jambani, Majhigadia, Mankadapada, Ranipokhari, Notta, Sarat, Saradiha, Kalamgadia, Padmapokhari, Labanyadeipur, Ramchandrapur and Dewani Bahali. The total population of this block is 1,48,717, which is dominated by Scheduled Tribes people like Bathudi, Kolha, Santal, Gond, Saunti and the mejor used languages are Odia, Santali, Ho, Bengali, Kui.

Education 
Kaptipada CD block has 120 primary schools, 54 upper primary schools and 36 High schools. There are two collage named Kaptipada college, Kaptipada and Kaptipada collage, Nuasahi both are affiliated to North Odisha University.

Tourist attractions 
Kaptipada is geographically located in triangle of wildlife reserver of India i.e., Similipal Tiger Reserve, Hadgarh Wildlife Sanctuary and Kuldiha Wildlife Sanctuary, which create a magnificent tourist attraction.

 Sunei Dam
 Kalo Dam
 Jhinkeswar temple
 Samibrukya

Villages

References

Mayurbhanj district
Community development blocks in Odisha